Soshanguve High School is a government secondary school located in Soshanguve, a township situated about  north of Pretoria.

History 
The school was founded in 1978.

References 

1978 establishments in South Africa
Educational institutions established in 1978
High schools in South Africa
Schools in Gauteng